The Battle on Pyana River took place on August 2, 1377 between the Blue Horde Khan Arapsha (Arab-Shah Muzaffar) and a Russian alliance under Knyaz Ivan Dmitriyevich, made up of the Pereyaslavl, Yaroslavl, Yuryev, Nizhny Novgorod, and Murom principalities.

The Russian army, being drunken, was almost entirely routed by small forces of Arapsha, while Ivan Dmitriyevich had drowned together with druzhina and staff. The river's name Pyana, translated as "drunken" from Russian, is derived from those events. The corresponding events are further recorded in the medieval Russian Chronicle On The Slaughter at Pyana River.

Background
In 1377 Moscow became aware of Arapsha and Knyaz Dmitry raising an army to recover his father-in-law Dmitri of Nizhny Novgorod. However nothing had happened and the troops returned to Moscow. Young knyaz Ivan Dmitriyevich, who assumed the joint command, moved the troops to River Pyana. The voyevodas learned that Arapsha was still far away, on the river Volchyi Vody, a tributary of Don. Because of hot weather, the awaiting Russian warriors began wandering around and consuming alcoholic beverages like mead and beer, which the troops of Suzdal prince drank while waiting in the local villages for the battle to begin.

The battle
By the time the Russian troops were intoxicated, Arapsha, drawn by Mordva nobles, had sensibly arrived and divided his troops into five units. On August 2, he unexpectedly attacked the Russians from all sides. Unable to fight, the Russians retreated to Pyana. Ivan Dmitriyevich had drowned together with numerous servants and warriors while crossing the river. The rest were slain by Blue Horde soldiers. The aftermath was catastrophic. The Tatars under Arapsha were then able to reach Niznhy Novgorod, prompting the evacuation of residents by boats, while Dmitry of Suzdal evacuated to Suzdal. The town itself was sacked.

Bibliography

Notes

References
 

Conflicts in 1377
Pyana
Pyana River
1377 in Europe
14th century in Russia